10 Network may refer to:

 Ten Broadcasting, a Canadian broadcasting company specializing in adult programming
 Network 10, a major Australian commercial TV network